Shelby is a city in Pottawattamie and Shelby counties in the U.S. state of Iowa. The population was 727 at the time of the 2020 census.

History
Shelby got its start in the late 1860s, following construction of the railroad through the territory.

Shelby was platted in 1870 by Benjamin F. Allen and Thusie Allen, and was incorporated in 1877.

The Chicago, Rock Island and Pacific Railroad Stone Arch Viaduct, north-east of Shelby, is listed on the National Register of Historic Places.

Geography
Shelby is located at  (41.514291, -95.450038).

Demographics

2010 census
As of the census of 2010, there were 641 people, 263 households, and 171 families living in the city. The racial makeup of the city was 98.6% White, 0.2% African American, 0.2% Native American, 0.2% Asian, and 0.9% from two or more races. Hispanic or Latino of any race were 0.9% of the population.

There were 263 households, of which 29.7% had children under the age of 18 living with them, 46.8% were married couples living together, 13.7% had a female householder with no husband present, 4.6% had a male householder with no wife present, and 35.0% were non-families. 27.4% of all households were made up of individuals, and 9.5% had someone living alone who was 65 years of age or older. The average household size was 2.38 and the average family size was 2.86.

The median age in the city was 40.8 years. 22.6% of residents were under the age of 18; 8.6% were between the ages of 18 and 24; 24.7% were from 25 to 44; 29.1% were from 45 to 64; and 15% were 65 years of age or older. The gender makeup of the city was 48.0% male and 52.0% female.

2000 census
As of the census of 2000, there were 696 people, 268 households, and 173 families living in the city. The racial makeup of the city was 98.85% White, 0.43% Native American, and 0.72% from two or more races. Hispanic or Latino of any race were 1.01% of the population.

There were 268 households, out of which 31.3% had children under the age of 18 living with them, 53.7% were married couples living together, 8.6% had a female householder with no husband present, and 35.1% were non-families. 30.2% of all households were made up of individuals, and 15.7% had someone living alone who was 65 years of age or older. The average household size was 2.40 and the average family size was 3.03.

Age spread: 26.9% under the age of 18, 6.6% from 18 to 24, 28.9% from 25 to 44, 23.0% from 45 to 64, and 14.7% who were 65 years of age or older. The median age was 37 years. For every 100 females, there were 96.6 males. For every 100 females age 18 and over, there were 91.4 males.

The median income for a household in the city was $31,250, and the median income for a family was $40,000. Males had a median income of $28,393 versus $20,909 for females. The per capita income for the city was $14,720. About 3.9% of families and 13.0% of the population were below the poverty line, including 8.0% of those under age 18 and 3.9% of those age 65 or over.

Time capsule
Shelby's "Centennial Time Capsule" was opened on Friday, June 25, 2021. It was scheduled to open on July 16, 2020 but was delayed due the COVID-19 pandemic.  It was located in Shelby Park near the intersection of Center Street and West Street. The capsule was sealed on July 16, 1970 as part of Shelby's centennial celebration.

Education 
The community is served by the AHSTW Community School District. It was in the Shelby Community School District until July 1, 1996, when that district merged into the A-H-S-T Community School District. That one in turn merged into AHSTW on July 1, 2016.

See also 
 List of timelines for time capsule install and open dates.

References

External links
 A-H-S-T Community School District Official Web Site

Cities in Iowa
Cities in Pottawattamie County, Iowa
Cities in Shelby County, Iowa